Comic Roots was a British television series from the early 1980s, documenting the biographies and influences of a number of popular comedians of the era.

Episodes included features on Les Dawson, and Alexei Sayle. Sayle converted his own documentary into an impromptu pub crawl.

Episodes

Series one (1982)
Les Dawson's Lancashire (2 August 1982)
Roy Hudd's Croydon (9 August 1982)
Irene Handl's London (16 August 1982)
Paul Shane's Rotherham (16 August 1982)

Series two (1983)
Michael Palin (12 August 1983)
Billy Dainty (19 August 1983)
Alexei Sayle (26 August 1983)
Kenneth Williams (2 September 1983)

1982 British television series debuts
1983 British television series endings
1980s British documentary television series
English-language television shows
ITV documentaries